Karunki is a locality situated in Tornio Municipality, Lapland, Finland with 483 inhabitants in 2012.

Karunki is located at the Torne river in where the border to Sweden goes. On the Swedish side of the river, opposite to Karunki, the village Karungi (pop 232) is located. There is no bridge, but crossing the river is done by boat or on the ice. These two villages have a common history since before the national border was drawn in the river, through the village, in 1809.

The wooden church of Karunki is designed by Finnish architect Anton Wilhelm Arppe. It was built in 1815–1817.

References 

Tornio
Finland–Sweden border crossings
Divided cities